Crabb v Arun District Council [1975] EWCA Civ 7 is a leading English land law and contract case concerning "proprietary estoppel". Lord Denning MR affirmed that where agreements concern the acquisition of rights over land, there is no need for both parties to provide a consideration for upholding the bargain. While promissory estoppel cannot found a cause of action it was held that in the peculiar situation of land, consideration is not necessary at all.

Facts
In 1965 Mr Victor Crabb bought 2 acres of land in the sea-side village of Pagham, near Bognor Regis. His boundary onto  acres to the west, demarcated by publicly owned Mill Park Road, belonged to Arun District Council (ADC) (formerly Chichester Rural District Council). His north boundary faced Hook Lane. He thought he enjoyed two access points on Mill Park Road, which led up to Hook Lane, and out of the village, point "A" and point "B". The access point "A" was open by virtue of a formalised easement, granted when the previous owner of the whole  acres had sold the property on to the current owners, Access point "B" was open only because the council was letting Crabb use it, with no formal written agreement in place.

In February 1968 ADC put up gates at point "A" and "B". Crabb believing that he had assurances to use both gates, sold off the northern half of the land, where access point "A" was. For the southern half of the land, he relied on having access point "B" open. In January 1969 he secured the inside of the gate at point "B" with padlocks. ADC responded by replacing the gates with a fence. Crabb asked for to access point to be re-opened. ADC said they would in return for £3000. Crabb subsequently sued the council, alleging that he had been given an assurance that the gates would remain open.

The trial judge found that Crabb had received no formal or firm assurance, but more importantly, if there was, Crabb had given no consideration in return for it, and it was not enforceable. Crabb appealed the decision.

Judgment
Lord Denning MR held that the promise could be enforced, and that a right of access over ADC's land be made way for. it was also ruled it may have been appropriate for Crabb to pay some amount for the cost of the works in relation to the erection and removal of the fence, but in view of the fact that the land had been unusable for the five or six years the fence had been in place, Crabb had no financial liability in relation to the costs related to the fence being erected or removed.

Lawton LJ gave a shorter concurring judgment.

Scarman LJ said the following.

See also

English contract law
English trusts law

Notes

References

Lord Denning cases
English enforceability case law
English estoppel case law
1975 in British law
Court of Appeal (England and Wales) cases
1975 in case law
English land case law
20th century in West Sussex